"The Show Must Go On" is a song co-written by Leo Sayer and David Courtney and first recorded by Sayer. It was released in the United Kingdom in 1973, becoming Sayer's first hit record (reaching its chart peak of #2 in early 1974 in the UK). The song reached #3 on the Irish Singles Chart in January 1974, and was included on Sayer's debut album Silverbird.

The song was covered by Three Dog Night, whose version was released in 1974, becoming a hit in the United States, peaking at #4 on the Billboard Hot 100 and sung by vocalist Chuck Negron. The record reached #1 on the Cashbox pop chart, #2 on the Canadian RPM Magazine charts, and became their seventh and final Gold Record.

It uses a circus theme as a metaphor for dealing with the difficulties and wrong choices of life. Early in Sayer's career, he performed it dressed and made up as a pierrot clown. Like the album version on Sayer's debut album, Three Dog Night's version also quotes Julius Fučík's "Entrance of the Gladiators" which is commonly associated with circus clowns.

In Sayer's version, the last line of the chorus is "I won't let the show go on". Three Dog Night changed this line to "I must let the show go on", which Sayer has criticized.

Personnel 
 Leo Sayer - vocals
 Russ Ballard - banjo
 David Courtney – piano
 Robert Henrit - drums
 Dave Wintour - bass

Chart performance

Leo Sayer version

Three Dog Night version 
Three Dog Night's cover of "The Show Must Go On" became their last Top 10 hit in the U.S., where it reached number four on the Billboard Hot 100 and number one on the Cash Box Top 100, as well as in Canada, where it reached number two.  It also reached #11 in the Netherlands and #12 in Germany.

Record World said that "3DN's treatment of this Leo Sayer English smash is a superb example of their interpretive power."

Several AM radio edits have shortened the instrumental introduction, due to time constraints and limitations.

Weekly charts

Year-end charts

Certifications

Pasadena Roof Orchestra version 
The Pasadena Roof Orchestra's 1977 album "The Show Must Go On" takes its name from the track, and (in an unusual departure into contemporary music) features their cover version of the song; it was re-released as part of their Jubilee Collection CDs in 2018.

References

Bibliography 
Gogan, Larry (1987). The Larry Gogan Book of Irish Chart Hits (Maxwell Publications) 
Whitburn, Joel (1996). The Billboard Book of Top 40 Hits, 6th Edition (Billboard Publications),

External links 

1974 singles
1973 songs
Three Dog Night songs
Cashbox number-one singles
Leo Sayer songs
Songs written by Leo Sayer
Songs written by David Courtney
Chrysalis Records singles
Dunhill Records singles
Song recordings produced by Jimmy Ienner